Vexillum (Costellaria) suluense is a species of small sea snail, marine gastropod mollusk in the family Costellariidae, the ribbed miters.

Description
The shell size varies between 5 mm and 30 mm

Distribution
This species is distributed along the Andaman Islands and in the Pacific Ocean along the Philippines, Fiji, the Solomons Islands, Papua New Guinea and Queensland, Australia.

References

 Turner H. 2001. Katalog der Familie Costellariidae Macdonald, 1860. Conchbooks. 1–100-page(s): 63

External links
 Reeve, L. A. (1844-1845). Monograph of the genus Mitra. In: Conchologia Iconica, or, illustrations of the shells of molluscous animals, vol. 2, pl. 1-39 and unpaginated text. L. Reeve & Co., London.

suluense
Gastropods described in 1850